Daniel Lawrence Simpson is a United States Air Force major general who serves as the Assistant Deputy Chief of Staff for Intelligence, Surveillance and Reconnaissance. Previously, he was the Director of Intelligence of the United States Forces Afghanistan.

References

Living people
People from Reno, Nevada
Place of birth missing (living people)
Recipients of the Defense Superior Service Medal
Recipients of the Legion of Merit
United States Air Force generals
United States Air Force personnel of the War in Afghanistan (2001–2021)
Year of birth missing (living people)